Weatherchem is a company managing plastic dispensing for packaging headquartered in Twinsburg, Ohio.

General
Founded with the acquisition of Akheny Co. in 1971, Weatherchem created the original Flapper dispensing closure. Weatherchem's customers include manufacturers of food, chemical and personal-care products. The caps are injection-molded and made from polypropylene.

Products
Weatherchem's original Flapper Dispensing Closure was made in 1983. This technology was made in food industry by such companies as McCormick, and other uses such as healthcare. In 2006, the company introduced four new products: the Grinder NR, LiquiFlapper, FlapMate and NutraGen II to expand the management of plastic dispensing.

Historical highlights

1971 Albert J. Weatherhead acquires Ankeny Co. and renames it Weatherchem Corporation
2006 Joins GMA-SAFE audit program
2012 Weatherchem Corporation was acquired by Mold-Rite Plastics.

References

External links
Weatherchem Corp. stands as an example of how an injection molder can remain healthy in down times and flourish in good times
Weatherchem Company looking to cap success
Weatherchem founder molded by adversity
Flip-top flavor enhancers for dog food
Closure for pourable products
New LiquiFlapper closure on maple syrup

Privately held companies based in Ohio
Manufacturing companies based in Cleveland